Danylenko or Danilenko is a Ukrainian-language surname.
Notable people with this surname include:

 Anatoliy Danylenko (born 1953), Ukrainian politician
 Artyom Danilenko (born 1990), Russian footballer
 Dana Danilenko (born 2001), Israeli badminton player
 Danylo Danylenko (born 1994), Ukrainian athlete
 Dmitriy Danilenko (born 1995), Russian fencer
 Dmytro Danylenko (born 1999), Ukrainian sprint canoeist
 Tetyana Danylenko (born 1983), Ukrainian journalist
 Viktoriia Danilenko (born 1994), Russian gymnast
 Vladimir Danilenko (born 1999), Russian Paralympic swimmer
 Vyacheslav Danilenko (born 1935), Soviet scientist

See also
 
 

Ukrainian-language surnames
Patronymic surnames
Surnames from given names